Mälarhöjdens IK were a Swedish football club located in Hägersten in the southern part of Stockholm. They merged with Hägersten SK in 2018 to become Mälarhöjden-Hägersten FF.

Background
Mälarhöjdens Idrottsklubb (MIK) was formed on 20 March 1924. The club currently has about 1,600 members divided into sections covering football, athletics, walking, hockey, orienteering, skiing and tennis. The club's greatest achievements have been in athletics, particularly in middle and long distance running events in the 1960s and 1970s.  In 1945 the club enjoyed a season in the Allsvenskan for bandy.

Since their foundation Mälarhöjdens IK has participated mainly in the middle and lower divisions of the Swedish football league system.  The club currently plays in Division 4 Södra Stockholm which is the sixth tier of Swedish football. They play their home matches at the Mälarhöjdens IP in Hägersten.

Mälarhöjdens IK are affiliated to the Stockholms Fotbollförbund.

Recent history
In recent seasons Mälarhöjdens IK have competed in the following divisions:

2017 Division IV, Stockholm Södra
2016 Division IV, Stockholm Södra
2015 Division IV, Stockholm Södra
2014 Division IV, Stockholm Mellersta
2013 Division IV, Stockholm Mellersta
2012 Division IV, Stockholm Södra
2011 Division IV, Stockholm Södra
2010	Division III, Östra Svealand
2009	Division IV, Stockholm Södra
2008	Division IV, Stockholm Södra
2007	Division IV, Stockholm Södra
2006	Division IV, Stockholm Södra
2005	Division IV, Stockholm Södra
2004	Division IV, Stockholm Mellersta
2003	Division IV, Stockholm Mellersta
2002	Division IV, Stockholm Mellersta
2001	Division IV, Stockholm Södra
2000	Division IV, Stockholm Södra
1999	Division IV, Stockholm Södra
1998	Division IV, Stockholm Södra

Footnotes

External links
 Mälarhöjdens IK – Official club website
 Mälarhöjdens IK Fotboll – Official football website

Football clubs in Stockholm
Orienteering clubs in Sweden
Defunct bandy clubs in Sweden
Association football clubs established in 1924
Bandy clubs established in 1924
1924 establishments in Sweden